Nogometni klub Bratstvo Gračanica or simply NK Bratstvo Gračanica is a professional association football club from the city of Gračanica that is situated in Bosnia and Herzegovina.

Bratstvo currently plays in the First League of the Federation of Bosnia and Herzegovina and plays its home matches on the Luke Stadium in Gračanica, which has a capacity of 3,000 seats.

Honours

Domestic

League
Second League of the Federation of Bosnia and Herzegovina:
Winners (2): 2006–07 , 2010–11

Club seasons

Managerial history
 Velibor Pudar (13 Aug 2008 – 30 June 2009)
 Nusret Muslimović (1 July 2012 – 27 June 2013)
 Denis Sadiković (1 July 2013 – 30 June 2014)
 Fuad Grbešić (5 July 2014 – 25 October 2014)
 Zoran Ćurguz (15 January 2015 – 11 May 2015)
 Irfan Džindić (13 May 2015 – 30 June 2016)
 Nusret Muslimović (1 July 2016 – 6 January 2017)
 Denis Sadiković (16 January 2017 – 1 May 2017)
 Nusret Muslimović (2 May 2017 – 14 June 2018)
 Nikola Nikić (20 June 2018 – present)

References

External links
NK Bratstvo Gračanica at Facebook

 
Association football clubs established in 1945
Sport in the Federation of Bosnia and Herzegovina
1945 establishments in Bosnia and Herzegovina
Football clubs in Bosnia and Herzegovina